The 1876 United States presidential election in Michigan took place on November 7, 1876, as part of the 1876 United States presidential election. Voters chose 11 representatives, or electors, to the Electoral College, who voted for president and vice president.

Michigan was won by the Republican nominee Rutherford B. Hayes by an almost 8% margin, defeating Democratic candidate Samuel J. Tilden and taking the state's eleven electoral votes.

Results

See also
 United States presidential elections in Michigan

References

Michigan
1876
1876 Michigan elections